Carbamoyl phosphate is an anion of biochemical significance. In land-dwelling animals, it is an intermediary metabolite in nitrogen disposal through the urea cycle and the synthesis of pyrimidines. Its enzymatic counterpart, carbamoyl phosphate synthetase I (CPS I), interacts with a class of molecules called sirtuins, NAD dependent protein deacetylases, and ATP to form carbamoyl phosphate. CP then enters the urea cycle in which it reacts with ornithine (a process catalyzed by the enzyme ornithine transcarbamylase) to form citrulline.

Production
It is produced from bicarbonate, ammonia (derived from amino acids), and phosphate (from ATP). The synthesis is catalyzed by the enzyme carbamoyl phosphate synthetase. This uses three reactions as follows:

  + ATP → ADP +  (carboxyl phosphate)
   +  NH3  + OH−   →    +  −O–C(O)NH2  +  H2O
−O–C(O)NH2  +  ATP  →  ADP +

Clinical significance 
A defect in the CPS I enzyme, and a subsequent deficiency in the production of carbamoyl phosphate has been linked to hyperammonemia in humans.

See also
 Ornithine transcarbamylase
Citrulline
Urea Cycle

References

Bibliography 

"SIRT5 Deacetylates Carbamoyl Phosphate Synthetase 1 and Regulates the Urea Cycle". Cell. 137 (3): 560–570. 2009-05-01. doi:10.1016/j.cell.2009.02.026. ISSN 0092-8674.

Organophosphates
Carbamates
Acid anhydrides
Urea cycle